Vicente Martín Tarud (born 18 December 1993) is a Chilean field hockey player.

Career

Club level
Vicente Martín currently plays for Club Manquehue in the Chilean national competition.

During his career, he has also represented English club, Beeston HC.

Junior national teams

Under–18
Martín made his first appearance for Chile in 2010, for the national U–18 team at the Pan American Youth Championship in Hermosillo. He followed this up with an appearance at the Youth Olympic Games in Singapore.

Under–21
In 2012 Martín made his debut for the Chilean U–21 team at the Pan American Junior Championship in Guadalajara, where he won a bronze medal.

Los Diablos
Martín made his debut for Los Diablos in 2013 at the Pan American Cup in Brampton.

He has medalled three times in his senior career. He has won two silver medals at the South American Games, at the 2014 and 2018 editions in Santiago and Cochabamba, respectively. In 2015 he took won a bronze medal at the Pan American Games in Toronto.

References

External links

1993 births
Living people
Chilean male field hockey players
Field hockey players at the 2015 Pan American Games
Pan American Games bronze medalists for Chile
Pan American Games medalists in field hockey
South American Games silver medalists for Chile
Competitors at the 2014 South American Games
Competitors at the 2018 South American Games
Medalists at the 2015 Pan American Games
21st-century Chilean people